This table lists those stars or other objects which have Bayer designations, grouped by the constellation part of the designation.

See also 
 Greek alphabet
 List of constellations
 Table of stars with Flamsteed designations

Notes 

Lists of stars